The 2013 ATS Formel 3 Cup was the 11th edition of the German F3 Cup (German Formula Three Championship) in motorsport. The season began on 27 April at Oschersleben and finished on 29 September at Hockenheim after nine race weekends, with 26 races – one race at the Nürburgring was cancelled – completed in total. The championship was dominated by Marvin Kirchhöfer in his debut year finishing with 25 podiums including 13 wins.

Teams and drivers

Race calendar and results
On 28 January 2013, the final version of the 2013 calendar was released with nine triple-header meetings. With the exception of a round at Circuit de Spa-Francorchamps, all rounds took place on German soil. The series was part of the ADAC Masters Weekend package six times, with additional rounds in support of the 24 Hours Nürburgring, and Deutsche Tourenwagen Masters events at the Lausitzring and Oschersleben.

Championship standings

Cup
 Only cars released in 2008–2011 equipped with Volkswagen Power Engine are eligible for Cup standings. Points are awarded as follows:

† — Drivers did not finish the race, but were classified as they completed over 90% of the race distance.

Trophy
 Only cars released in 2002–2011 without Volkswagen Power Engine are eligible for Trophy standings.

† — Drivers did not finish the race, but were classified as they completed over 90% of the race distance.

SONAX Rookie-Pokal
Rookie drivers are only eligible for the SONAX Rookie-Pokal title if they have not previously competed in more than two events of  national or international Formula 3 championship and not aged 26 in 2012.

† — Drivers did not finish the race, but were classified as they completed over 90% of the race distance.

Teams
Only the highest car from each team is eligible to teams' standings.

DMSB's standings
 Only for German drivers.

† — Drivers did not finish the race, but were classified as they completed over 90% of the race distance.

Footnotes

References

External links
 Official Site

German Formula Three Championship seasons
Formula Three
German
German Formula 3 Championship